Sir James McCrone Douie  (8 March 1854 – 18 March 1935) was a British colonial official who served briefly as Lieutenant Governor of the Punjab.

Biography
Douie was born at Largs, Ayrshire, a son of the Rev. David Buchan Douie who was minister at Largs Free Church. He was educated at the High School and University of Edinburgh. He was appointed to the Indian Civil Service after passing the examination in 1874, and spent the two-year probationary period at Balliol College, Oxford, where he was awarded the Boden Sanskrit scholarship in 1876 but was not able to take a degree. At the end of 1876 he arrived in India where all of his service of 35 years was passed in the Punjab.

Douie became Chief Secretary to the government of the Punjab in 1900, and "had a large share in moulding the famous Land Alienation Act". He became Settlement Commissioner in 1903 and Financial Commissioner in 1909. He officiated as Lieutenant Governor of the Punjab from April to August 1911. He then retired from the service.

Douie was appointed  in the 1906 New Year Honours and knighted KCSI at the Delhi Durbar in December 1911. The University of Oxford awarded him an honorary M.A. degree in 1915.

Publications
Translation of parts of Vespasiano da Bisticci, Vite de uomini illustri del secolo XV, ed. Lodovico Frati (Bologna, 1892-3)
Panjab Settlement Manual, 1899
The Panjab, North-West Frontier Province and Kashmir, Cambridge University Press, 1916

Family
In 1885 Douie married Mary, daughter of Charles Roe (later Sir Charles Roe, Chief Justice of the Chief Court of the Punjab). They had two sons and four daughters. Lady Douie died in 1965.

References

DOUIE, Sir James McCrone, Who Was Who, A & C Black, 1920–2016 (online edition, Oxford University Press, 2014)

1854 births
1935 deaths
People from Largs
Alumni of the University of Edinburgh
Alumni of Balliol College, Oxford
Indian Civil Service (British India) officers
Governors of Punjab (British India)
Knights Commander of the Order of the Star of India